Bend Senior High School is the oldest high school located in Bend, Oregon, United States. The school opened , in 1904, but did not graduate its first class of seniors (three students) until 1909. Old Bend High School, the original building, was located downtown on Bond Street, where the Bend-La Pine School District office now stands. The school's mascot is a lava bear.

Academics
In 2008, 80% of the school's seniors received a high school diploma. Of 406 students, 325 graduated, 50 dropped out, 12 received a modified diploma, and 19 were still in high school in 2009.

Notable alumni
 Pat Cashman - Seattle television and radio personality and voice actor
 Kiki Cutter - World Cup ski racer, 1968 Olympian
 Ryan Longwell - NFL placekicker
 Robert D. Maxwell - World War II Medal of Honor recipient, class of 2011
 Donald L. McFaul - U.S. Navy SEAL killed in Panama, December 1989 during Operation Just Cause; namesake of USS McFaul (DDG 74)
 Les Schwab - founder of Les Schwab Tire
 Ralph Towner -  American multi-instrumentalist, composer, arranger and band leader

References

External links
 
 Max Preps – Bend Lava Bears

High schools in Deschutes County, Oregon
Educational institutions established in 1904
Education in Bend, Oregon
Public high schools in Oregon
1904 establishments in Oregon
International Baccalaureate schools in Oregon